Liantang  is a town of the People's Republic of China situated in Zhaoqing, Guangdong, China.

Liantang was the birthplace of Tsang Tsou Choi.

See also
List of township-level divisions of Guangdong

References

Gaoyao
Towns in Guangdong